Epimecinus is a genus of South Pacific intertidal spiders that was first described by Eugène Simon in 1908.

Species
 it contains four species:
Epimecinus alkirna Gray, 1973 – Australia (Western Australia)
Epimecinus humilis Berland, 1924 – New Caledonia
Epimecinus nexibilis (Simon, 1906) (type) – New Caledonia
Epimecinus pullatus (Simon, 1906) – New Caledonia

References

Araneomorphae genera
Desidae
Spiders of Oceania
Taxa named by Eugène Simon